Davis Ducart (active from c. 1761, died 1780/81), was an architect and engineer in Ireland in the 1760s and 1770s. He designed several large buildings and engineering projects. He had associations with the canal builders of the time and the mining industry and worked on many projects in the County Tyrone coalfield.

Early life and identity
His origins are uncertain, but thought to be Piedmontese and/or Sardinian. No relatives were mentioned in his will.

Richard Killeen (2012) states that Ducart was an architect from Sardinia.

Major projects in Ireland
In Limerick Ducart produced the plan of plots to be leased in the Georgian extension of the city known as Newtown Pery and also those of the Custom House (1769), now home to the Hunt Museum.

Other Buildings
Castletown Cox, County Kilkenny.
Brockley Park, County Laois.
Castlehyde House, County Cork.
Drishane House, County Cork.
Kilshannig, County Cork.
Lota Lodge, County Cork.
Mayoralty (or Mansion) House, Cork, County Cork.

Unconfirmed buildings
Florence Court, County Fermanagh.
Castlecore House, Ballymahon, County Longford
Crosshaven House, Knocknagore, County Cork.

References

Architects from Sardinia
Irish architects
1780s deaths
1699 births